The Lo Nuestro Award for Regional Mexican Album of the Year  is an award presented annually by American network Univision. It was first awarded in 1989 and has been given annually since. The accolade was established to recognize the most talented performers of Latin music. The nominees and winners were originally selected by a voting poll conducted among program directors of Spanish-language radio stations in the United States and also based on chart performance on Billboard Latin music charts, with the results being tabulated and certified by the accounting firm Deloitte. At the present time, the winners are selected by the audience through an online survey. The trophy awarded is shaped in the form of a treble clef.

The award was first presented to Si Me Recuerdas by Mexican group Los Bukis. Mexican-American band Intocable holds the record for the most awards, winning on five occasions. Tejano acts Selena and La Mafia, Mexican bands Banda el Recodo, Bronco, Conjunto Primavera, and singer-songwriters Pepe Aguilar and Juan Gabriel, won the award twice each.

Winners and nominees
Listed below are the winners of the award for each year, as well as the other nominees for the majority of the years awarded.

See also
 Grammy Award for Best Banda Album
 Grammy Award for Best Mexican/Mexican-American Album
 Grammy Award for Best Norteño Album
 Latin Grammy Award for Best Banda Album
 Latin Grammy Award for Best Norteño Album

References

Regional Mexican New Album of the Year
Regional Mexican music albums
Awards established in 1989
Album awards